The United States – Indonesia Society (USINDO) is a non-government organization devoted to enhancing Americans’ understanding of Indonesia, Indonesians’ knowledge of America, and strengthening relations between the two countries and their people.  It is a bi-national organization co-chaired by J. Stapleton Roy (former United States Ambassador to Indonesia) and Arifin Siregar (former Indonesia Ambassador to the United States). An independent organization, USINDO receives its support from corporations, individuals, and foundations interested in strengthening Indonesia - U.S. relations.

USINDO believes bilateral educational exchanges provide the strongest foundation for U.S.-Indonesian relations.  USINDO offers educational programs in both the United States and Indonesia.  As a 501(c)(3) non-profit organization, USINDO does not lobby the U.S. Congress or the administration on any particular piece of legislation or policy. USINDO has approximately 8,000 participants, almost half of them residing in Indonesia, with the rest in the United States and other countries.

External links
 United States–Indonesia Society website

Non-profit organizations based in Washington, D.C.
501(c)(3) organizations
Indonesia–United States relations